The city of Ottawa, Canada held municipal elections on January 6, 1919 to elect members of the 1919 Ottawa City Council.  

The election saw a woman elected in the city for the first time, with Marion McDougall (wife of the late John Lorn McDougall) being elected as a public school trustee in Dalhousie Ward.

Mayor of Ottawa
Fisher won seven of the city's nine wards, while Parent won the city's two francophone wards, By and Ottawa.

Plebiscites

The plebiscite lost in all but three wards, but won St. George Ward (which the bridge would connect with Downtown) by a large enough margin to pass city-wide by just nine votes.  Despite the result, a bridge would not be built at that location until the Corktown Footbridge was built in 2006.

Ottawa Board of Control
(4 elected)

Ottawa City Council
(2 elected from each ward)

References

Municipal elections in Ottawa
1919 elections in Canada
1919 in Ontario
1910s in Ottawa
January 1919 events